Dhirajlal Hirachand Ambani (28 December 1932 – 6 July 2002) was an Indian businessman who founded Reliance Industries in 1958. Ambani took Reliance public in 1977. In 2016, he was honoured posthumously with the Padma Vibhushan, India's second-highest civilian honour for his contributions to trade and industry. Ambani faced numerous accusations of market manipulation, tax evasion, and cronyism.

Early career

Dhirubhai Ambani was one of the sons of Hirachand Gordhanbhai Ambani, a village school teacher belonging to the Modh vaniya (Baniya) community and Jamnaben Ambani and was born in Chorwad, Malia Taluka, Junagadh district, Gujarat on 28 December 1932. He did his studies from Bahadur Khanji school. He left Aden in 1958 to try his hand at his own business in India in the textiles market. It is also said that he has worked at Petrol pump as a petrol vendor.

Founding of Reliance Industries
Ambani returned to India and started "Majin" in partnership with Champaklal Damani, his second cousin, who lived with him in Yemen. Majin was to import polyester yarn and export spices to Yemen.

The first office of the Reliance Commercial Corporation was set up at the Narsinatha Street in Masjid Bunder. It was a  room with a telephone, one table and three chairs. Initially, they had two assistants to help them with their business.

During this period, Ambani and his family stayed in a two-bedroom apartment at the Jai Hind Estate in Bhuleshwar, Mumbai. In 1965, Champaklal Damani and Dhirubhai Ambani ended their partnership and Ambani started on his own. It is believed that both had different temperaments and different takes on how to conduct business. While Damani was a cautious trader and did not believe in building yarn inventories, Ambani was a known risk-taker and believed in building inventories to increase profit. In 1966 he formed Reliance Commercial Corporation which later became Reliance Industries on 8 May 1973.

He launched the brand Vimal during this time which sold polyester materials for saris, shawls, suits, and dresses.

Controversies

Allegation of market manipulation 
Extensive marketing of the brand in the interiors of India made it a household name. Franchise retail outlets were started and they sold the "Only Vimal" brand of textiles. In the year 1975, a technical team from the World Bank visited the 'Reliance Textiles' Manufacturing unit.

In 1988, Reliance Industries came up against a rights issue regarding partly convertible debentures. It was rumored that the company was making all efforts to ensure that their stock prices did not slide an inch. Sensing an opportunity, The Bear Cartel, a group of stock brokers from Calcutta, started to short sell the shares of Reliance. To counter this, a group of stock brokers until recently referred to as "Friends of Reliance" started to buy the short-sold shares of Reliance Industries on the Bombay Stock Exchange.

The Bear Cartel was acting on the belief that the Bulls would be short of cash to complete the transactions and would be ready for settlement under the "Badla" trading system operative in the Bombay Stock Exchange. The bulls kept buying and a price of  152 per share was maintained until the day of settlement. On the day of settlement, the Bear Cartel was taken aback when the Bulls demanded a physical delivery of shares. To complete the transaction, much money was provided to the stock brokers who had bought shares of Reliance, by Dhirubhai Ambani. In the case of non-settlement, the Bulls demanded an Unbadla, or penalty sum, of  35 per share. With this, the demand increased and the shares of Reliance shot above  180 in minutes. The settlement caused an enormous uproar in the market.

To find a solution to this situation, the Bombay Stock Exchange was closed for three business days. Authorities from the Bombay Stock Exchange (BSE) intervened in the matter and brought down the "Unbadla" rate to  2 with a stipulation that the Bear Cartel had to deliver the shares within the next few days. The Bear Cartel bought shares of Reliance from the market at higher price levels and it was also learnt that Dhirubhai Ambani himself supplied those shares to the Bear Cartel and earned a healthy profit out of The Bear Cartel's adventure.

After this incident, many questions were raised by his detractors and the press. Not many people were able to understand how a yarn trader until a few years ago was able to get in such a huge amount of cash flow during a crisis period. The answer to this was provided by the then finance minister, Pranab Mukherjee in the Parliament. He informed the house that a Non-Resident Indian had invested up to  220 million in Reliance during 1982–83. These investments were routed through many companies like Crocodile, Lota and Fiasco. These companies were primarily registered in Isle of Man. All the promoters or owners of these companies had a common surname Shah. An investigation by the Reserve Bank of India in the incident did not find any unethical or illegal acts or transactions committed by Reliance or its promoters.

Death
Ambani was admitted to the Breach Candy Hospital in Mumbai on 24 June 2002 after he suffered a major stroke. It was his second stroke, the first had occurred in February 1986 and had paralyzed his right hand. He was in a coma for more than a week and a number of doctors were consulted. He died on 6 July 2002.

Post death
Following his first stroke in 1986, Ambani handed over control of Reliance to his sons, Mukesh and Anil. In November 2004, Mukesh in an interview admitted to having differences with Anil over ownership issues. He also said that the differences "are in the private domain".
After the death of Dhirubhai Ambani, the group was split into Reliance Industries Limited headed by Mukesh, and Reliance Anil Dhirubhai Ambani Group headed by Anil. So finally Mukesh Ambani was elected as the CEO and Anil Ambani was elected as the chairperson.

As of 2017, the company has more than 250,000 employees. In 2012, Reliance Industries was one of the two Indian companies to be ranked among the top 100 in the Fortune 500 list of the world's largest companies by revenue.

In popular media
In 1988 an unauthorized biography of Dhirubhai Ambani, by Hamish McDonald with the title The Polyester Prince, outlined all his political and business conquests. The book was not published in India because the Ambanis threatened legal action; an updated version went on sale under the title Ambani and Sons in 2010, and there has been no action against the publisher so far.

A Hindi film said to be inspired by the life of Dhirubhai Ambani was released on 12 January 2007. Guru, directed by filmmaker Mani Ratnam, cinematography by Rajiv Menon and music by A.R. Rahman shows the struggle of a man striving to make his mark in the Indian business world with a fictional Shakti Group of Industries.

Accolades
 June 15, 1998 – Dean's Medal by The Wharton School, University of Pennsylvania, for setting an outstanding example of leadership. Dhirubhai Ambani was the first Indian to receive the Dean's Medal
January 2016- posthumously awarded the Padma Vibhushan, Padma bhushan the country's first and second-highest civilian award .

Bibliography

See also
 Dhirubhai Ambani Institute of Information and Communication Technology

References

External links
    
   
 Founder Chairman, Reliance
 McDonald, Hamish (July 15, 2002). "Remembering the Prince of Polyester". Time.

 

1932 births
2002 deaths
Indian billionaires
Indian industrialists
Businesspeople from Mumbai
People from Junagadh
Recipients of the Padma Vibhushan in trade & industry
Dhirubhai
Reliance Industries people
Gujarati people
Indian Hindus